(born January 30, 1973) is a Japanese actress and singer-songwriter. She is affiliated with J.P. Room, a subsidiary of the Up-Front Group.

Biography 
Born in Suzuka, Mie, Japan, Noriko Katō graduated from Tokyo Metropolitan Yoyogi High School.

Katō's career began in 1991 as a member of Sakurakko Club, together with Anza Oyama, Miki Nakatani, Miho Kanno, and Hiroko Kurumizawa. On July 25, 1992, she released her first single, a cover of Chisato Moritaka's "Kondo Watashi Doko ka Tsurete itte Kudasai yo". The single peaked at No. 69 on Oricon's singles chart and earned her a New Artist Award nomination at the 34th Japan Record Awards.

In 2000, Katō moved to France to study the French language. She resumed her entertainment career when she returned to Japan two years later.

Personal life 
Katō married creative director  on December 27, 2005. They divorced on April 15, 2010. On March 3, 2013, Katō married Tokyo No. 1 Soul Set member .

Filmography

TV drama 
  (NTV, 1993)
  (TV Asahi, 1994)
  (TV Asahi, 1995)
  (NTV, 1997)
  (TV Asahi, 1998)
  (TBS, 1999)
  (NTV, 2000)
  (TV Tokyo, 2002)
  (TV Tokyo, 2003)
  (TBS, 2010)
  (NHK, 2015)

Discography

Singles

Studio albums

Cover albums

Video albums

References

External links
 
 Official blog
 
 

1973 births
Living people
Japanese actresses
Japanese idols
Japanese women singer-songwriters
Japanese women pop singers
Musicians from Mie Prefecture
People from Mie Prefecture
20th-century Japanese women singers
20th-century Japanese singers
21st-century Japanese women singers
21st-century Japanese singers
Up-Front Group